is a private university at Nagakute, Aichi, Japan, founded in 1971.

External links
 Official website 

Educational institutions established in 1971
Private universities and colleges in Japan
Medical schools in Japan
Universities and colleges in Aichi Prefecture
Nagakute, Aichi
1971 establishments in Japan